The boys' tournament competition of the beach volleyball events at the 2022 South American Youth Games took place from 28 April to 1 May 2022 at the Estadio Arena in the La Rural cluster. The defending South American Youth Games champions were Juan Amieva and Mauro Zelayeta 
, led by Sebastian Stratchan, from Argentina.

Brazilian pair Henrique Camboim and Pedro Sousa won the gold medal after defeating the Chilean pair Maximiliano Córdova and Martín Etcheberry in the final. Paraguayans Ángel Palacios and Camilo Vargas kept the bronze medal.

Teams
Twelve teams entered to the event.

Groups composition
The groups were conformed as follows:

Results
All match times are in PET (UTC−5).

Preliminary round

Group A

Group B

Group C

Group D

Placement 9th–12th

9th–12th semi-finals

11th–12th place match

9th–10th place match

Placement 1st–8th
The quarter-finals matchups were:

Match M: 1st Group A vs. 2nd Group D
Match N: 1st Group D vs. 2nd Group A
Match O: 1st Group B vs. 2nd Group C
Match P: 1st Group C vs. 2nd Group B

The semi-finals matchups were:

Match Q: Winner Match N vs. Winner Match O
Match R: Winner Match M vs. Winner Match P

Quarter-finals

5th–8th semi-finals

Semi-finals

7th–8th place match

5th–6th place match

Bronze medal match

Gold medal match

Final ranking

References

External links
Rosario 2022 Beach Volleyball

South American Youth Games
2022 South American Youth Games